Hambre de Amor is the first album by the Mexican singer Patricia Manterola, released in 1994.

Track listing
 Lo Juro	
 Ni Caso
 Hambre de Amor	
 Quiero
 Regálame Una Rosa	
 Acuérdate De Mí	
 Mi Religión Eres Tú
 Eclipse De Amor	
 Quien No Trabaja No Hace El Amor	
 Vuelo Donde Me Lleva El Corazón

References

1994 debut albums
Patricia Manterola albums